Travis Turner (born May 9, 1987), also known as "Little T" or "T", is a Canadian actor and rapper.

Early life
Turner was born in the small town of Oliver, British Columbia, and finished high school in Alberta. He began his career at the age of six. He is currently a business owner and entrepreneur, alongside an entertainer, based in Vancouver, British Columbia.

Career
Turner's first role was a recurring role in the science-fiction drama Caprica. Later he got a role in the film Confined, alongside Battlestar Galactica star Michael Hogan. In 2005, Turner was awarded the "Outstanding Male Performance in a Supporting Role" award at the Alberta One Act Festival.

Since moving to Vancouver, however, Turner has also appeared in short films, including Scars, Henchin and Snow Tramp, which were shown at multiple festivals, including the Tao New Mexico Mountain, New Zealand Mountain, Vancouver International MidForms, New Media Festival 2009, Made in Vancouver and the Hollywood North Showcase.

His first feature was in Easter Bunny Blood Bath, and he filmed a Mattel games commercial soon after. Turner also had a role in Teletoon's Tower Prep. He also had roles in the series Fairly Legal and Supernatural. His biggest role to date was when he starred in Marley & Me: The Puppy Years, the followup to the 2008 feature film Marley & Me.

He had a role in the TV movie A Princess for Christmas. He also landed a starring role in A Fairly Odd Christmas Nickelodeon's sequel to A Fairly Odd Movie: Grow Up, Timmy Turner!, alongside Drake Bell and Daniella Monet. Turner played the character Aster Vanderberg in the Netflix and YTV series Some Assembly Required. He also voices Lui Shirosagi in the anime Beyblade Burst.

In 2016, he voiced Tender Taps in the My Little Pony: Friendship is Magic season six episode "On Your Marks".

He is the voice of Trip Hamston in the Littlest Pet Shop series, Littlest Pet Shop: A World of Our Own, which premiered in April 2018. He also provides the voice of the Robot Master Ice Man in Mega Man: Fully Charged.

In recent years he played Rocky on Disney’s Pup Academy He voiced the English Dub in Tobot the South Korean Anime as the character Swag and guest starred on Polly Pocket as Agustus Von Uberich. 

His latest live action Aliens Stole My Body Turner plays the infamous Lackey. This is the sequel to Aliens Ate My Homework Based the on the children’s book series.

His most recent cameo in Some Of Our Stallions was produced by Mike Judge and directed by Carson Mell.

References

External links

1987 births
Living people
Canadian male film actors
Canadian male television actors
Canadian male voice actors
Male actors from British Columbia
People from Oliver, British Columbia
21st-century Canadian male actors